Paweł Anweiler (born 16 June 1950 in Kalisz) is a Polish Lutheran clergy of the Evangelical-Augsburg Church in Poland since 1992 with a residence in Bielsko-Biała.

From 1974 to 1976, he was a curate in Kalisz and work from 1976 to 1979 as administrator of the Evangelical Church in Kępno.
From 1979 to 1991 he was the Clergy in Częstochowa, and then for a year the clergy of Bielsko-Biała.
From 1992 to 2016 he was Lutheran Bishop of the Diocese of Cieszyn of the Evangelical-Augsburg Church in Poland.

References 
 Paweł Anweiler Homepage

1950 births
Polish Lutheran bishops
Living people
People from Kalisz
Recipients of the Order of Polonia Restituta